Uri Cohen, (born May 26, 1992), is an Israeli football player who plays as a defender for Maccabi Ramla.

Cohen grew up in the Maccabi Tel Aviv youth academy and made his debut with the senior team in 2010.

External links
 

1992 births
Israeli Jews
Living people
Israeli footballers
Maccabi Tel Aviv F.C. players
Hapoel Petah Tikva F.C. players
Sektzia Ness Ziona F.C. players
Hapoel Katamon Jerusalem F.C. players
Hapoel Tel Aviv F.C. players
Hapoel Acre F.C. players
Hapoel Hadera F.C. players
Hapoel Ironi Baqa al-Gharbiyye F.C. players
F.C. Holon Yermiyahu players
Maccabi Ironi Tamra F.C. players
F.C. Ramla players
Israeli Premier League players
Liga Leumit players
Footballers from Ramla
Association football defenders